Sir Charles Glemham (1576–1625) was an English courtier and politician who sat in the House of Commons from 1621 to 1625.

Glemham was the son of Christopher Glemham of Glemham, Suffolk. He matriculated at Exeter College, Oxford on  4 May 1593, aged 16.

In 1621, he was elected Member of Parliament for Aldeburgh. In 1622 he had licence to travel to the East Indies. He was elected MP for Newcastle-under-Lyme in 1624 and Aldeburgh for a second time in the Useless Parliament of 1625.

He was knighted on 6 May 1625 and was Master of the Household in 1625.

He died at Plymouth in September 1625.

References

1576 births
1625 deaths
Alumni of Exeter College, Oxford
English MPs 1621–1622
English MPs 1624–1625
English MPs 1625
English knights
Members of the Parliament of England for Newcastle-under-Lyme
Masters of the Household